The Pekin Street Historic District is a residential historic district bounded by Pekin and Candace Streets, Douglas and Chalkstone Avenues in Providence, Rhode Island.  It is a well-preserved densely built neighborhood of working class housing, built almost entirely between 1870 and 1910.  Most of the structures are either two or three-family units, with two-families predominating among the older buildings and triple-deckers among the later ones.  The buildings are generally set on narrow lots with small yards.  The district's main north-south roads are Pekin and Candace Streets, which are joined by a number of cross streets.

The district was listed on the National Register of Historic Places in 1984.

See also
National Register of Historic Places listings in Providence, Rhode Island

References

Historic districts in Providence County, Rhode Island
Geography of Providence, Rhode Island
National Register of Historic Places in Providence, Rhode Island
Historic districts on the National Register of Historic Places in Rhode Island